Subharathri is a 2019 Indian Malayalam-language family drama film written and directed by Vyasan K. P. The film, based on true events, follows Mohammad who set out for his first Hajj pilgrimage. It stars Siddique, Dileep, Anu Sithara, Shanthi Krishna, Asha Sharath and Aju Varghese. The film was released in India on 6 July 2019.

Plot
 
Muhammed is sincere and generous. Having lost his father at a young age, it becomes his responsibility to look after his younger sisters and mother and he does everything he could. Though he couldn't succeed in his love life, he is a happily married elderly whose major goal is to go for Hajj. According to Islam, Hajj is one of the five pillars and all Muslims who fulfil 'certain' conditions must perform Hajj at least once in their lifetime. And the certain conditions includes spiritual fitness and being emotionally happy. He makes sure to reconcile with his brother, seek forgiveness from his friend and even meets up with long lost love. Muhammed meets all these conditions and is jovial enough for the trip until the fateful night, when he encounters the stranger in his house Krishnan.

The 2nd half of the movie moves with Krishnan and his love interest Sreeja. Some incident (robbery) which happened in the past boomerangs back and affects the life of Krishnan and Sreeja.

Though the 1st half looks bit lengthy but the way how it is being handled to show case the importance of Muhammad trying to reconcile with all his relatives and friends (even with his class 7 friend Indrans are classic moments).

Muhammad meets Suhara his youth time lover after 30+ years. His entire family now receive Suhara with lots of love and affection. Also the love, loss and reunion  between Muhammad and Suhara comes to an end in a beautiful note.

The movie ends with beautiful message.

Cast

 Siddique as Mohammad
 Dileep as Krishnan
 Anu Sithara as Sreeja
 Shanthi Krishna as Khadeeja
 Asha Sarath as Suhara
 Sheelu Abraham as Dr. Sheela
 Nadirshah as Shanavas
 Aju Varghese as George
 K. P. A. C. Lalitha as Mother superior
 Nedumudi Venu as Majeed
 Suraj Venjaramoodu as Adv. Harikumar
 Indrans as A. C. Suresh
 Sai Kumar as Ummer
 Hareesh Peradi as CI Hari
 Swasika as Sulnama
 Jayan Cherthala as Jayapalan
 Thesni Khan as Sainaba
 Ashokan as SI Ashok
 Sudhi Koppa as Raju
 Sreejit Sudhakaran as Riyas
 Manikandan R. Achari as Charli
 Vijay Babu as CI Balachandran
 Majeed as Thomachan
 Nandu Poduval as Narayanan
 Shobha Mohan as Jameela
 Prashanth Alexander as Salam
 Rekha Ratheesh as Sreeja's mother
 Archana Menon as Nabeesu

Production
The film is based on a true incident that occurred in Clappana in Kollam district. Filming began in March 2019 in Ernakulam. It was completed in early May 2019. Subharathri is the second directorial of Vyasan K. P. after Ayal Jeevichirippundu (2017).

Release
The film was released in Indian on 6 July 2019.

Critical reception
The Times of India rated 3.5 stars out of 5 and wrote that the film "narrates a simple tale, which can't claim to offer anything path-breaking. However, this is a movie that still manages to move the audience, in an age-old yet feel-good fashion, which will appeal to the family audience, the best". Sify rated it 3 in scale of 5 and wrote that it is "A feel good film, narrated in a rather conventional but honest manner". Rating 3 out of 5, Malayala Manorama wrote that "Shubharathri is a simple tale of a man and an honest approach made with lots of goodness". Gulf News wrote that "'Shubarathri' connects well with its simplicity and a social message that needs to be heard". Deccan Chronicle called it a "thrilling family drama" and said that "Though Shubharathri doesn't have anything path-breaking to narrate, it will please family audience" and rated 2.5 out of 5 stars.

References

External links
 

2010s Malayalam-language films
Indian family films
Indian drama films
Films shot in Kollam
Films shot in Kochi
2019 drama films